Haryana State Akali Dal (or HSAD) is a Sikh political party in India, a splinter group of the Badal-led Shiromani Akali Dal that sided with Gurcharan Singh Tohra on the Ranjit Singh issue.  HSAD was formed on 23 May 1999 on similar lines as Shiromani Akali Dal Delhi. Five out of eleven Shiromani Gurdwara Prabhandak Committee members from Haryana state joined HSAD. The HSAD general secretary is Kartar Singh Takkar.

Political parties in Haryana
Sikh political parties
Political parties established in 1999
1999 establishments in Haryana
Shiromani Akali Dal